The Encyclopedia of Dragons is a 2002 book by the Romanian writer Mircea Cărtărescu, with illustrations by Tudor Banus. It focuses on dragons in Romanian folklore, and includes ten short stories about dragons. Cărtărescu groups it with his books Why We Love Women and Beautiful Strangers as a trilogy of prose with lower literary ambition.

See also
 2002 in literature
 Romanian literature

References

Further reading

External links
 The Encyclopedia of Dragons at the publisher's website 

2002 short story collections
Books about dragons
Romanian short story collections
Works by Mircea Cărtărescu